The first Konex Master Chess Tournament organized by the founder and president of the Konex Foundation, Luis Ovsejevich, started off in Buenos Aires in 1977. The foundation sponsored Marcelo Tempone, World Chess Champion Junior, for further training and so as to participate in international tournaments (1979-1980), the Argentine Team to the Olympiads for players under 26, held at Mexico City 1980, the Argentine Chess Team, to the First World Chess Championship for Teams, held in Lucerne, Switzerland, in 1985, Hugo Spangenberg (13 years old) in the Infant World Chess Championship, at Puerto Rico 1989, and the participation of the Argentine and South American (Female) Champion Claudia Amura in the Inter-Zone Chess Tournament in Moscow, Russia, in 1990.

Konex Master Chess Tournament

{| class="sortable wikitable"
! # !!Year !! Winner
|-
| 1 || 1977 (National, closed) ||  
|-
| 2 || 1979 (International invitation tournament) ||   
|-
| 3 || 1980 (Open tournament) || , clear first
|-
| 4 || 1985 (Zonal) ||   
|-
| 5 || 1987 (International invitation tournament) || 
|-
| 6 || 1988 (International invitation tournament)||   
|-
| 7 || 1991 (Open tournament) || , first on tie-break
|-
| 8 ||1994  (Open tournament) || , first on tie-break
|}

References

Chess competitions
Chess in Argentina
Recurring events established in 1977